The Lomako River is a river in Équateur province, Democratic Republic of the Congo. The Lomako is a tributary of the Maringa River. The Maringa River joins with the Lopori River to the north, to form the Lulonga River, a tributary of the Congo River. The Lomako flows through the Lopori / Maringa basin, also known as the Maringa-Lopori-Wamba forest Landscape, an area of great ecological importance.

References 

Rivers of the Democratic Republic of the Congo